The 2022 American Association season is the 17th season of professional baseball in the American Association of Professional Baseball (AA) since its creation in October 2005. There are 12 AA teams, split evenly between the East Division and the West Division.

Season schedule
During the Off-Season the league added Lake Country DockHounds to replace the temporary traveling team Houston Apollos. The league was split up into two divisions, the East and West Division. The season will be played with a 100-game schedule, with two home series and two road series inside a teams’ division, and one home series and one road series against the clubs outside its division. The top four teams in each division will qualify for the 2022 playoffs.

Regular Season Standings
as of September 5, 2022

 y – Clinched division
 x – Clinched playoff spot
 e – Eliminated from playoff contention

Statistical leaders
as of September 5, 2022

Hitting

Pitching

Awards

All-star selections

East Division

West Division

All-star game MVP — Jabari Henry

Home run derby

End of year awards 
TBD

Playoffs

Format 
In 2022, the top four teams in each division will advance to the playoffs. In a nod to innovation, and to reward the clubs with the best regular seasons, the club that wins the division in the regular season will pick their first-round opponent of the qualifiers within the division, in the best-of-three Division Playoff Series.

In the second round, the Division Championship Series will also be a best-of-three series. The Miles Wolff Cup Finals will culminate in the crowning of a league champion, with a best-of-five series to determine the league champion.

Playoff bracket

See also
2022 in baseball
2022 Major League Baseball season

References

American Association season
American Association of Professional Baseball